No Limite 4 (also known as No Limite: Ceará) was the fourth season of the Brazilian reality show No Limite filmed in Trairi, Ceará, Brazil, location that was previously used for the first season. The premiere aired Thursday, July 30, 2009.

Nineteen contestants were chosen by the producers to participate in the show between July to September 2009. The last original contestant was chosen by the public vote, in a competition between two male contestants aired on July 26, 2009.

During the show, three new contestants entered on the game, replacing two female players who withdrew from the competition and one male player, who broke the rules and was expelled from the show.

The two initial tribes were Taiba and Manibu. On episode 9, the two teams merged into a tribe called Carnaúba. These three tribes were named after beaches located in Ceará.

For the first time, contestants were eliminated by public vote. On each "cycle" of the show, two members of the losing tribe faced each other in the "Tribal Council Battle" (one member chosen by other team members and the other member chosen by the current team leader), then the public would vote on the contestant they wanted out.
Fifth episode onwards, this method was dropped, returning the show to its original format.

The season included a new twist that originally came from the American version called Exile Island, where one castaway from each tribe are banished for Exile Island for the time period between the immunity challenge and the Tribal Council.

While on Exile Island, each exiled castaway picked from one of two urns. One urn contained a clue to the Hidden Immunity Idol, while the other urn contained nothing.

This season creates the second ever all-female final two, first occurring in the first season, when all the final four contestants were women. The season also lasted 62 days, being the longest season ever in Survivor franchise.

The winner was 38-year-old Luciana de Araújo, a firefighter from Goiânia, Goiás. She defeated psychologist Gabriela Costa in a 6–4 vote at the live finale to take the R$500,000  prize.

Contestants

The Total Votes is the number of votes a castaway has received during Tribal Councils where the castaway is eligible to be voted out of the game. It does not include the votes received from the "Tribe Leader" and during the Final Tribal Council.

The game

Voting history

References

External links
 Official Site 
 No Limite on Gshow.com

2009 Brazilian television seasons
No Limite seasons